The Frommer Stop is a Hungarian long-recoil, rotating bolt pistol manufactured by Fémáru, Fegyver és Gépgyár (FÉG) (Metalware, Weapons and Machine Factory) in Budapest. It was designed by Rudolf Frommer, and its original design was adopted as the Pisztoly 12M in 1912, created for the Royal Hungarian Army. The handgun was manufactured in various forms from 1912 to 1945 and used in the Hungarian Armed Forces as well as, during the First World War, by the Ottoman Army in limited quantities.

The Stop incorporated design features of earlier Frommer pistols including the Model 1901 (M1901) and M1904 derived from the Roth–Theodorovic pistol. The predecessor to the M1911, the Stop pistol was chambered in a proprietary 7.65mm (.32-caliber) cartridge having a crimp in the casing at the base of the bullet. Frommer redesigned the pistol with a more conventional layout. Patented in 1912, this variant was produced from 1919 to 1939, under the name Pisztoly 19M. It was adopted as the official sidearm of the Hungarian Armed Forces. The last variant of the Stop, the Pisztoly 39M, was produced in 9mm Kurz (.380 ACP); however it was never adopted as a service pistol.

As a double-barrel machine gun
The Frommer M1917 Stop pistol was also used in a dual mounted tripod that fired both pistols in full automatic. The pistols were inserted upside down and fed from 25-round box magazines.

See also
List of pistols

Underbarrel pistols
GMC pistol
Jieffeco Model 1911

References

External links
 Frommer double barrel machine gun
 Frommer M.17 palm fired pistol
 

.32 ACP semi-automatic pistols
.380 ACP semi-automatic pistols
World War I submachine guns
Machine pistols
Long recoil firearms
Semi-automatic pistols of Hungary
World War I Austro-Hungarian infantry weapons
World War II infantry weapons
Weapons of the Ottoman Empire
Fegyver- és Gépgyár firearms